Pierri is a surname. Notable people with the surname include:

Álvaro Pierri (born 1953), Uruguayan classical guitarist
Luis Pierri (born 1963), Uruguayan basketball player
Olga Pierri (1914–2016), Uruguayan guitarist and educator

See also
Perri (name)
Pierre